The Euro Ice Hockey Challenge is a yearly series of national ice hockey tournaments, organized during the international breaks defined in the IIHF calendar in November, December, and February. Tournaments are played in different locations in Europe and sometimes feature teams from outside of Europe, usually Japan.

Organization 
The EIHC was founded in October 2001 by the IIHF. Participants are the ice hockey national teams of countries that are themselves at or around the level of the IIHF World Championship Division I. It is a second-tier equivalent to tournaments of  the Euro Hockey Tour.

Almost all the teams use the EIHC as preparation for the World Championship later in the same year. It is an opportunity for teams to test less experienced players and for them to gain valuable ice time at an international level.

2011-2012 tournaments
The 2012 edition consisted of seven tournaments:

2nd International Break
EIHC Hungary

Standby: 

EIHC Belarus

EIHC Poland

Standby:

3rd International Break
EIHC Romania

Standby: /

EIHC Slovenia

Standby:

4th International Break
EIHC Norway

EIHC Ukraine

Standby: /

References

External links
 EIHC website
 Italian EIHC tournament website
 Coverage of the EIHC by eurohockey.net

Ice hockey tournaments in Europe
2001 establishments in Europe
Recurring sporting events established in 2001